The 1948 Heathrow disaster was the crash of a Douglas DC-3C of the Belgian airline Sabena at Heathrow Airport, London, United Kingdom on 2 March 1948. It was the first major accident at Heathrow Airport; of the 22 people on board 20 were killed, of whom most had British nationality.

Aircraft
The DC-3 involved was built in 1947 with serial number 43154 and registration OO-AWH and was used by the Belgian airline company Sabena from 21 March 1947 until its destruction in 1948. It was built for a US military contract but was never delivered and was the last DC-3 to be built by Douglas.

Crash 
The Sabena flight departed from Brussels, Belgium en route to London, United Kingdom under the command of pilot Henri Goblet and radio officer Jean Lomba.

Workers in a hangar nearby saw the aircraft crash on the runway and quickly went to the survivors' aid. When they reached the aircraft there was utter devastation, only the tail section of the aircraft was left intact. However, there were survivors and the workers quickly pulled a few passengers from the burning wreckage. They could hear the screams of those still trapped in the inferno and despite all their efforts those people perished. When emergency personnel finally arrived on the scene, there was no one left to save. It was later concluded that a high number of passengers survived the crash but died in the blaze either by burning to death or smoke inhalation. The three survivors were badly burned and were quickly taken to the hospital, where one of them soon died from his injuries. One of the survivors was former MP Otho Nicholson.

Aftermath
Following the crash, the United Kingdom's Ministry of Civil Aviation stipulated that ground-controlled approaches would no longer be available to aircraft landing in conditions of less than  vertical visibility and  horizontal visibility except in an emergency. In the wake of the crash and that of a Douglas DC-4 two months later, Sabena postponed its 25th anniversary celebrations that had been scheduled for the end of May 1948. The two airport workers who entered the burning wreckage to rescue survivors, Harold Bending and Angus Brown, were awarded the George Medal in June 1948.

References

Sabena accidents and incidents
Airliner accidents and incidents caused by pilot error
Airliner accidents and incidents involving controlled flight into terrain
Airliner accidents and incidents involving fog
Aviation accidents and incidents in London
1948 disasters in the United Kingdom
Accidents and incidents involving the Douglas DC-3
March 1948 events in the United Kingdom
20th century in Middlesex
Disasters in Middlesex
History of the London Borough of Hillingdon
Aviation accidents and incidents at Heathrow Airport
1948 in the United Kingdom
March 1948 events in Europe
Aviation accidents and incidents in the United Kingdom
Aviation accidents and incidents in England